Patricia Gates Lynch Ewell (born Patricia Ann Lawrence; April 20, 1926 – December 4, 2011) was a post-war NBC news correspondent in Europe but was known to much of the world as the host of the "Breakfast Show" on the English language service of the Voice of America during the 1960s and 70s. Ewell was also a United States Ambassador to Madagascar and the Comoros (1986–89) and served as Press Secretary to First Lady Pat Nixon. She was a member of  the American Academy of Diplomacy and Vice-President of the Council of American Ambassadors. She was born in Newark, New Jersey and died in Fairfax, Virginia, of ovarian cancer.

Bibliography

References

External links

1926 births
Ambassadors of the United States to Madagascar
Ambassadors of the United States to the Comoros
People from Newark, New Jersey
2011 deaths
American women ambassadors
American women journalists
20th-century American diplomats
20th-century American women
21st-century American women